Piotr Kosewicz (born 31 May 1974) is a Polish Paralympic athlete. He is also a photographer.

Career 
He toon up the sport of biathlon in 1994 and competed in the sport until 2002 before taking an extended break from the sport. He later took up the sport of para-athletics in 2015.

Winter Paralympics 
He made his Paralympic debut as a biathlete representing Poland at the 1998 Winter Paralympics and competed in LW10 sitting pursuit event. He also represented Poland at the 2002 Winter Paralympics and competed in LW10 sitting pursuit event.

Summer Paralympics 
He qualified to compete at the 2020 Summer Paralympics after claiming a silver medal in men's discus throw T52 event at the 2019 World Para Athletics Championships.

He represented Poland at the 2020 Summer Paralympics which was his debut appearance at a Summer Paralympics event and his third Paralympic appearance as well as his first Paralympic appearance since competing at the 2002 Winter Paralympics. He clinched gold medal in the men's discus throw during the Tokyo Olympics.

References 

1974 births
Living people
Polish male discus throwers
Polish male biathletes
Paralympic athletes of Poland
Paralympic biathletes of Poland
Biathletes at the 1998 Winter Paralympics
Biathletes at the 2002 Winter Paralympics
Athletes (track and field) at the 2020 Summer Paralympics
Medalists at the 2020 Summer Paralympics
Paralympic gold medalists for Poland
Paralympic medalists in athletics (track and field)
People from Lubań